Anarcho-naturism, also referred to as anarchist naturism and naturist anarchism, appeared in the late 19th century as the union of anarchist and naturist philosophies. In many of the alternative communities established in Britain in the early 1900s, "nudism, anarchism, vegetarianism and free love were accepted as part of a politically radical way of life". In the 1920s, the inhabitants of the anarchist community at Whiteway, near Stroud in Gloucestershire, "shocked the conservative residents of the area with their shameless nudity". Mainly, it had importance within individualist anarchist circles in Spain, France, Portugal and Cuba.

Anarcho-naturism advocates vegetarianism, free love, nudism, hiking and an ecological world view within anarchist groups and outside them. Anarcho-naturism also promotes an ecological worldview, small ecovillages, and most prominently nudism as a way to avoid the artificiality of the industrial mass society of modernity. Naturist individualist anarchists see the individual in their biological, physical and psychological aspects and try to eliminate social determinations.

History

Early influences 
An important early influence on anarchist naturism was the thought of Henry David Thoreau, Leo Tolstoy and Élisée Reclus. 
 Thoreau was an American author, poet, naturalist, tax resister, development critic, surveyor, historian, philosopher, and leading transcendentalist. He is best known for his book Walden, a reflection upon simple living in natural surroundings, and his essay, Civil Disobedience, an argument for individual resistance to civil government in moral opposition to an unjust state. Simple living as a rejection of a materialist lifestyle and self-sufficiency were Thoreau's goals, and the whole project was inspired by transcendentalist philosophy. "Many have seen in Thoreau one of the precursors of ecologism and anarcho-primitivism represented today in John Zerzan. For George Woodcock this attitude can be also motivated by certain idea of resistance to progress and of rejection of the growing materialism which is the nature of American society in the mid-19th century."

France 
For the influential French anarchist Élisée Reclus, naturism "was at the same time a physical means of revitalization, a rapport with the body completely different from the hypocrisy and taboos which prevailed at the time, a more convivial way to see life in society, and an incentive to respect the planet. Thus naturism develops in France, in particular under the influence of Élisée Reclus, at the end of the 19th century and beginning of the 20th century among anarchistic communities resulting from utopian socialism."

In France, later important propagandists of anarcho-naturism include Henri Zisly and Émile Gravelle who collaborated in La Nouvelle Humanité, Le Naturien, Le Sauvage, L'Ordre Naturel, and La Vie Naturelle. Their ideas were important in individualist anarchist circles in France as well as Spain, where Federico Urales (pseudonym of Joan Montseny) promoted the ideas of Gravelle and Zisly in La Revista Blanca (1898–1905).

Richard D. Sonn comments on the influence of naturist views in the wider French anarchist movement:

Henri Zisly

Henri Zisly (born in Paris, November 2, 1872; died in 1945) was a French individualist anarchist and naturist. He participated alongside Henri Beylie and Émile Gravelle in many journals such as La Nouvelle Humanité and La Vie Naturelle, which promoted anarchist-naturism. In 1902, he was one of the main initiators, alongside Georges Butaud and Sophie Zaïkowska, of the cooperative Colonie de Vaux established in Essômes-sur-Marne, in Aisne.

Zisly's political activity, "primarily aimed at supporting a return to 'natural life' through writing and practical involvement, stimulated lively confrontations within and outside the anarchist environment. Zisly vividly criticized progress and civilization, which he regarded as 'absurd, ignoble, and filthy.' He openly opposed industrialization, arguing that machines were inherently authoritarian, defended nudism, advocated a non-dogmatic and non-religious adherence to the 'laws of nature,' recommended a lifestyle based on limited needs and self-sufficiency, and disagreed with vegetarianism, which he considered 'anti-scientific.'"

Spain 
This relationship between anarchism and naturism was quite important at the end of the 1920s in Spain:

 
Isaac Puente, an influential Spanish anarchist during the 1920s and 1930s and an important propagandist of anarcho-naturism, was a militant of both the CNT anarcho-syndicalist trade union and Iberian Anarchist Federation.  He published the book El Comunismo Libertario y otras proclamas insurreccionales y naturistas (en:Libertarian Communism and other insurrectionary and naturist proclaims) in 1933, which sold around 100,000 copies, and wrote the final document for the Extraordinary Confederal Congress of Zaragoza of 1936 which established the main political line for the CNT for that year. Puente was a doctor who approached his medical practice from a naturist point of view. He saw naturism as an integral solution for the working classes, alongside Neo-Malthusianism, and believed it concerned the living being while anarchism addressed the social being. He believed capitalist societies endangered the well-being of humans from both a socioeconomic and sanitary viewpoint, and promoted anarcho-communism alongside naturism as a solution.

This ecological tendency in Spanish anarchism was strong enough as to call the attention of the CNT–FAI in Spain. Daniel Guérin in Anarchism: From Theory to Practice reports:

Cuba 
The historian Kirwin R. Schaffer in his study of Cuban anarchism reports anarcho-naturism as "[a] third strand within the island's anarchist movement" alongside anarcho-communism and anarcho-syndicalism. Naturism offered a global alternative health and lifestyle movement. Naturists focused on redefining one's life to live simply, to eat cheap but nutritious vegetarian diets, and to raise one's own food if possible. The countryside was posited as a romantic alternative to urban living, and some naturists even promoted what they saw as the healthful benefits of nudism. Globally, the naturist movement counted anarchists, liberals, and socialists as its followers. However, in Cuba a particular "anarchist" dimension evolved led by people like Adrián del Valle, who spearheaded the Cuban effort to shift naturism's focus away from only individual health to naturism having a "social emancipatory" function."

Schaffer reports the influence that anarcho-naturism had outside naturist circles. So "[f]or instance, nothing inherently prevented an anarcho-syndicalist in the Havana restaurant workers' union from supporting the alternative health care programs of the anarcho-naturists and seeing those alternative practices as 'revolutionary.'". "Anarcho-naturists promoted a rural ideal, simple living, and being in harmony with Nature as ways to save the laborers from the increasingly industrialized character of Cuba. Besides promoting an early twentieth-century "back-to-the-land" movement, they used these romantic images of Nature to illustrate how far removed a capitalist industrialized Cuba had departed from an anarchist view of natural harmony." The main propagandizer in Cuba of anarcho-naturism was the Catalonia born "Adrián del Valle (aka Palmiro de Lidia)...Over the following decades, Del Valle became a constant presence in not only the anarchist press that proliferated in Cuba but also mainstream literary publications...From 1912 to 1913 he edited the freethinking journal El Audaz. Then he began his largest publishing job by helping to found and edit the monthly alternative health magazine that followed the anarcho-naturist line Pro-Vida.

Other countries 
Naturism also met anarchism in the United Kingdom. "In many of the alternative communities established in Britain in the early 1900s nudism, anarchism, vegetarianism and free love were accepted as part of a politically radical way of life. In the 1920s the inhabitants of the anarchist community at Whiteway, near Stroud in Gloucestershire, shocked the conservative residents of the area with their shameless nudity."

In Italy, during the IX Congress of the Italian Anarchist Federation in Carrara in 1965, a group decided to split off from this organization and created the Gruppi di Iniziativa Anarchica. In the seventies it mostly comprised "veteran individualist anarchists with a pacifism orientation, naturism, etc,...".

See also 

 Adamites
 Anarcho-primitivism
 Eco-communalism
 Freedomites
 Green anarchism
 Individualist anarchism in Europe
 Lebensreform
 Lifestyle anarchism
 Naturism

References

Further reading

External links 
La Iconoclasta (the Iconoclast). Contemporary spanish anarcho-naturist magazine

Naturism
Anarchist culture
Naturism
Individualist anarchism
Environmental movements